EE, Ee or ee may refer to:

Arts and media
 E. E. Cummings, American poet
 Ee (band), American indie-rock band

Businesses and organizations
 Edmonton Elks, a Canadian Football League franchise based in Edmonton, Alberta
 EE Limited, a British mobile phone network
 El Paso Electric, a public utility company trading as EE on the New York Stock Exchange
 The English Electric Company Limited, a British-based industrial manufacturer of electrical components
 Entente Européenne d'Aviculture et de Cuniculture, also known as the Entente Européenne (EE) or the European Association of Poultry, Pigeon, Cage Bird, Rabbit and Cavy Breeders
 Evangelism Explosion, a method of evangelism used in a number of countries

Language
 ee, an English language digraph
 Ewe language (ISO 639-1 code EE)

Places
 Ee (island), an island in the Cook Islands
 Estonia (ISO country code EE)
 .ee, the ccTLD of Estonia
Ie, Noardeast-Fryslân, Netherlands (formerly Ee)

Science and technology

Biology and medicine
 Environmental enteropathy, in medicine, is a condition believed to be due to frequent intestinal infections
 Eosinophilic esophagitis, an allergic gastrointestinal disorder
 Estradiol enanthate, an estrogen which is used in combined injectable birth control
 Ethylmalonic encephalopathy, a genetic disorder
 Ethinylestradiol, an estrogen which is used in combined birth control pills
 Expressed emotion, in psychology

Chemistry
 Enantiomeric excess, in chemistry
 Ethoxyethyl ethers, a protecting group in chemistry

Computing and telecommunications
 Easy Editor, a text editor for the BSD computer operating system
 Emotion Engine, the CPU in PlayStation 2 game consoles
 Execution environment, such as Preboot Execution Environment
 Google Earth Engine, a GIS cloud computing platform

Other uses in science and technology
 Electrical engineering
 Electronic engineering
 EE (calculator key) (enter exponent), to enter numbers in scientific or engineering notation
 Environmental engineering
 End entity, a client communicating with certificate authority by means of Certificate Management Protocol

Transportation
Aero Airlines, whose IATA code is EE
EE (Eighth Avenue Local), an early local variant of the E
EE (Queens-Broadway Local), a route from Forest Hills to Whitehall Street, merged into the N in 1976
 Extreme E, an electric offroad rally racing series

Other uses
 -ee, a suffix for an object of a verb
 EE, a brassiere cup size
 EE, a North American standard shoe width
 Ee Peng Liang, Singaporean businessman
 Annie Ee Yu Lian, Singaporean abuse and murder victim

See also

 EES (disambiguation)
 EEE (disambiguation)
 E (disambiguation)
 EEC